John Snyder (born August 16, 1974), is an American former professional baseball pitcher. He played for the Chicago White Sox and Milwaukee Brewers of Major League Baseball (MLB).

External links

1974 births
Living people
American expatriate baseball players in Canada
Arizona League Angels players
Baseball players from Michigan
Birmingham Barons players
Calgary Cannons players
Cedar Rapids Kernels players
Charlotte Knights players
Chicago White Sox players
Gulf Coast White Sox players
Huntsville Stars players
Indianapolis Indians players
Lake Elsinore Storm players
Milwaukee Brewers players
Major League Baseball pitchers
Midland Angels players
Portland Beavers players
Salt Lake Stingers players